Sa-koi (also known as Sagwe) was a small Shan state in what is today Burma.  It belonged to the Central Division of the Southern Shan States.

References

Shan States